A low-energy transfer, or low-energy trajectory, is a route in space that allows spacecraft to change orbits using significantly less fuel than traditional transfers. These routes work in the Earth–Moon system and also in other systems, such as between the moons of Jupiter. The drawback of such trajectories is that they take longer to complete than higher-energy (more-fuel) transfers, such as Hohmann transfer orbits.

Low-energy transfers are also known as Weak Stability Boundary trajectories, and include ballistic capture trajectories.

Low-energy transfers follow special pathways in space, sometimes referred to as the Interplanetary Transport Network.

Example missions
Missions that have used low-energy transfers include:

 Hiten, from JAXA
 SMART-1, from ESA
 Genesis, from NASA.
 GRAIL, from NASA.

On-going missions planned to use low-energy transfers include:

 BepiColombo, from ESA/JAXA
 CAPSTONE from NASA
 Danuri from KARI

Proposed missions using low-energy transfers include:

 European Student Moon Orbiter (ESMO)
 Mars Direct

History

Low-energy transfers to the Moon were first demonstrated in 1991 by the Japanese spacecraft Hiten, which was designed to swing by the Moon but not to enter orbit. The Hagoromo subsatellite was released by Hiten on its first swing-by and may have successfully entered lunar orbit, but suffered a communications failure.

Edward Belbruno and James Miller of the Jet Propulsion Laboratory had heard of the failure, and helped to salvage the mission by developing a ballistic capture trajectory that would enable the main Hiten probe to itself enter lunar orbit.  The trajectory they developed for Hiten used Weak Stability Boundary Theory and required only a small perturbation to the elliptical swing-by orbit, sufficiently small to be achievable by the spacecraft's thrusters. This course would result in the probe being captured into temporary lunar orbit using zero , but required five months instead of the usual three days for a Hohmann transfer.

Delta-v savings

From low Earth orbit to lunar orbit, the  savings approach 25% on the burn applied after leaving low Earth orbit, compared to the retrograde burn applied near the Moon in the traditional , and allow for a doubling of payload.

Robert Farquhar had described a 9-day route from low earth orbit to lunar capture that takes 3.5 km/s. Belbruno's routes from low Earth orbit require a 3.1 km/s burn for trans lunar injection, a delta-v saving of not more than 0.4 km/s. However, the latter require no large delta-v change after leaving low Earth orbit, which may have operational benefits if using an upper stage with limited restart or in-orbit endurance capability, which would require the spacecraft to have a separate main propulsion system for capture.

For rendezvous with the Martian moons, the savings are 12% for Phobos and 20% for Deimos. Rendezvous is targeted because the stable pseudo-orbits around the Martian moons do not spend much time within 10 km of the surface.

See also

 Bi-elliptic transfer
 Gravity assist
 Interplanetary Transport Network
 Orbital mechanics

References

External links
 Celestial Mechanics Theory Meets the Nitty-Gritty of Trajectory Design
 Earth-to-Moon Low Energy Transfers Targeting L1 Hyperbolic Transit Orbit June 2005
 Low Energy Trajectories and Chaos: Applications to Astrodynamics and Dynamical Astronomy
 Navigating Celestial Currents

Astrodynamics